The list of  members of political families of Punjab, India

Talwandi Family 

 Jagdev Singh Talwandi, former President of Shiromani Akali Dal and Shiromani Gurdwara Parbandhak Committee; former Member of Parliament Lok Sabha from Ludhiana; former Member of Parliament Rajya Sabha; former Cabinet Minister Government of Punjab
 Ranjit Singh Talwandi, son of Jagdev Singh Talwandi; former MLA from Raikot constituency
 Jagjit Singh Talwandi, son of Jagdev Singh Talwandi; SGPC member
 Harjit Kaur Talwandi, daughter of Jagdev Singh Talwandi; President women's wing Shiromani Akali Dal(Sanyukt)
 Master Dev Raj Singh, former MLA

Royal Family of Patiala

 Mohinder Kaur, former member of Rajya Sabha and Lok Sabha
 Capt. Amarinder Singh, former Chief Minister of Punjab
 Preneet Kaur, wife of Amarinder Singh; former minister of state in the External Affairs Ministry, former Member of Parliament
 Raninder Singh, son of Amarinder Singh and Preneet Kaur; contested Lok Sabha election from Bathinda in 2009 and Assembly election from Samana (Punjab) in 2012

Badal Family

 Parkash Singh Badal, former Chief Minister of Punjab
 Sukhbir Singh Badal, former Deputy Chief Minister of Punjab and President of the Shiromani Akali Dal
 Harsimrat Kaur Badal, wife of Sukhbir and current Member of Parliament from Bathinda
 Gurdas Singh Badal, Member of Parliament from Firozpur
 Manpreet Singh Badal, Finance minister Government of Punjab

Beant Singh Family

 Beant Singh (chief minister), former Chief Minister of Punjab
 Gurkanwal Kaur, former MLA
 Ravneet Singh Bittu, Member of Parliament from Ludhiana
 Tej Parkash Singh, former MLA and Minister
 Gurkirat Singh Kotli, MLA Khanna, Cabinet minister Government of Punjab

Kairon Family

 Partap Singh Kairon (freedom fighter), (revolutionary), and former Chief Minister of Punjab
 Surinder Singh Kairon MP
 Adesh Partap Singh Kairon, grandson of Pratap Singh Kairon, former Cabinet minister Government of Punjab
 Gurinder Singh Kairon Congress leader

Jakhar Family

 Chaudhari Rajaram Jakhar, jaildar from Panchkoshi, Abohar, Fazilka, Punjab
 Balram Jakhar, 2 times MLA and leader of opposition, MP Ferozepur 1980, Speaker of Lok Sabha. Governor of Madhya Pradesh 
 Sajjan Kumar Jakhar, MLA and Minister 
 Sunil Kumar Jakhar, 3 times MLA, leader of opposition, Member of Parliament from Gurdaspur. Former chief of Punjab Pradesh Congress Committee

Bajwa Family

 Late Satnam Singh Bajwa, former Minister in Government of Punjab
 Partap Singh Bajwa, son of Satnam Singh Bajwa; Member of Parliament from Gurdaspur Loksabha constituency and Rajya Sabha, former President of Punjab Pradesh Congress Committee
 Fateh Jung Bajwa, son of Satnam Singh Bajwa; MLA
 Charanjit Kaur Bajwa, wife of Partap Singh Bajwa; former MLA

krishan kant family
 Late Lala Achint Ram A Noted freedom Fighter , Member of the Constituent assembly of India, Later member of parliament. A close aid of Pandit Nehru. Who was popularly known as the gandhi of Punjab
 LateSatyavati Devi (born 1905) A noted freedom fighter , wife of Lala Achint Ram and mother of Krishan Kant. She Often fed Bhagat Singh with her own hands.
Krishan Kant A freedom fighter, A noted parliamentarian , Goverener of Andhra Pradesh and Tamil Nadu and the 10th Vice President of India

Brar Family

 Late Harcharan Singh Brar, former Chief Minister of Punjab, former Minister of irrigation, power and health department, Governor of Orissa and Haryana, five-time MLA
 Gurbinder Kaur Brar, wife of Harcharan Singh Brar; former Leader of the opposition, former Member of Parliament, former Minister of State
 Adesh Kanwarjit Singh Brar, son of Harcharan Singh Brar; Vice president Punjab Pradesh Congress Committee, former MLA, former Youth Congress Chief of Punjab
 Karan Kaur Brar, daughter in law of Harcharan Singh Brar; former MLA

Chaudhary Family

 Late Master Gurbanta Singh, former Agriculture Minister of Punjab
 Late Chaudhary Jagjit Singh, former Cabinet Minister and MLA
 Chaudhary Surinder Singh, former MLA Kartarpur
Santokh Singh Chaudhary Member of Parliament from Jalandhar and former Cabinet Minister of Punjab
 Vikramjit Singh Chaudhary, MLA Phillaur and former Chief of Punjab Youth Congress

Gupta Family

 Harbans Lal Gupta, Freedom fighter; founding member, Praja Mandal Movement; former Speaker of Punjab Legislative Assembly (1964–67); Member of Legislative Assembly of (Congress) from Bathinda (1952–62) and Minister of State in Government of Punjab (1952–57)
 Anupam Gupta, special prosecutor, Central Bureau of Investigation; senior standing council for U.T Chandigarh; lawyer of the Liberhan Commission on the destruction of the Babri Masjid

Majithia Family

 Surat Singh, zamindar and military officer in the Khalsa Army In 1877, he was awarded the title of Raja and made a Companion of the Star of India.
 Umrao Singh, aristocrat and a scholar in Sanskrit and Persian and Father of Amrita Sher-Gil
Sundar Singh Majithia, landowner and politician. He was a member of Khalsa Nationalist Party and Revenue Member at the first and second legislative councils of the Punjab Legislative Assembly. The first president of the Shiromani Gurdwara Parbandhak Committee
 Wing Commander Sardar Surjit Singh Majithia, Indian politician, diplomat, and air force officer. Son of Sundar Singh Majithia
 Amrita Sher-Gil, Hungarian-Indian painter and daughter of Umrao Singh.
 Satyajit Singh Majithia, educationist, industrialist, philanthropist, and Chancellor of Khalsa University. Son of Sardar Surjit Singh Majithia, former Deputy Defence Minister
 Harsimrat Kaur Badal, a former Union Cabinet Minister of Food Processing Industries. Daughter of Satyajit Singh Majithia
 Bikram Singh Majithia, a former cabinet minister in the Punjab Government. Son of  Satyajit Singh Majithia

References

 
Political families of India by state or union territory
Lists of people from Punjab, India